A warlord is a military leader.

Warlord, War Lord or Warlords may also refer to:

Arts and entertainment

Film
 The War Lord, a 1965 American film starring Charlton Heston
 The Warlord (film), a 1972 Hong Kong film directed by Li Han-hsiang
 Warlords (film), a 1988 American film 
 The Warlords, a 2007 Chinese film directed by Peter Chan, starring Andy Lau, Jet Li and Takeshi Kaneshiro

Television
 "Warlord" (Star Trek: Voyager), a 1996 episode of Star Trek: Voyager
 "The War Lord" (I Spy), an episode of the series I Spy
 The War Lord, the chief of an alien race called the "War Lords" in the Doctor Who serial The War Games
 "The Warlords", fourth episode of the 1965 Doctor Who serial The Crusade

Music
 Warlord (band), an American 1980s heavy metal band
 Warlord (hardcore band), an American Christian metal band
 Warlord (album), a 2016 album by Yung Lean
 Warlord, a 1989 Skrewdriver album
 Warlord (demo), by Norther, 2000
 "The War Lord" (instrumental), theme music of the 1965 film

Comics
 Warlord (DC Thomson), a comic
 Warlord (manhua), a Hong Kong manhua written by Wan Yuet Long and drawn by Tang Chi Fai
 Warlord (DC Comics), a sword and sorcery comics series

Novels
 War Lord (novel), the last of the Saxon Stories series by Bernard Cornwell
 The Warlord, a six-book pulp-fiction book series from the 1980s, including The Warlord, the first novel in the series, written by Jason Frost
 War Lord, a 2006 novel based on the DC Comics character John Constantine, written by John Shirley
 Warlord, a 2005 novel by Jennifer Fallon

Games
 Warlords (game series), a series of computer games developed by SSG and later Infinite Interactive
 Warlords (1990 video game), the first game in the series
 Warlords (card game), a collectible card game based on the third game in the series
 Warlord: Saga of the Storm CCG, a collectible card game (with an accompanying table-top role-playing game)
 Civilization IV: Warlords, the first expansion pack to the Civilization IV game series
 Warlord (miniature game), a miniatures wargame produced by Reaper Miniatures
 The Warlord (board game), a game self-published by Mike Hayes in 1966
 Warlords (1980 video game), a game released by Atari in 1980
 Warlord (Dungeons & Dragons), a Dungeons & Dragons character class

Other uses
 The Warlord (wrestler), a ring name of professional wrestler Terry Szopinski
 War Lords, a militant African-American youth organization founded in the 1960s
 "WARLORDS", call sign of United States Navy helicopter squadron HSM-51
 VMFA-451, a deactivated United States Marine Corps fighter squadron that was nicknamed "The Warlords"

See also

 Lord of War, a 2005 film starring Nicolas Cage